2 Signal Regiment is a regiment of the Royal Corps of Signals within the British Army. One of its signal squadrons is part of the Queen's Gurkha Signals.

History 
The regiment can trace its history back to 2nd Company, The Telegraph Battalion, Royal Engineers. In 1907, it was designated as the Divisional Telegraph Company of the 2nd Infantry Division. During the Cold War the regiment remained the divisional signals regiment of the 2nd Infantry Division. After the end of the Cold War, the regiment was designated as a support signals regiment within 11th Signal Brigade.  Because of the regiment's strong link with the Gurkhas the regiment was awarded the Firmin Sword of Peace in 2017.

Under the Army 2020 reforms, the regiment fell under the command of 7 Signal Group of 11th Signal Brigade. After the disbandment of 2 Signal Group the regiment moved to the direct support role for the 11th Signal Brigade.

Current Organisation 
The current organisation of the regiment is:

 Regimental Headquarters, at Imphal Barracks, York
 214 Signal Squadron (Hawk)
 219 Signal Squadron (Tripoli)
 Support (Jorvik) Squadron

Alliances and Affiliations 
 - Leeds University Officer Training Corps
 - Sheffield University Officer Training Corps

Freedoms 
1977 - Gained Freedom of Lübbecke
2001 - Gained Freedom of York

Footnotes 

Regiments of the Royal Corps of Signals
Military units and formations established in 1907